Steve Duggan (born 10 April 1958) is an English former professional snooker player.

Career

Steve Duggan was born on 10 April 1958, in Thurnscoe, England. In 1982 he won the Pontins Autumn Open tournament. He was accepted as a professional snooker player by the World Professional Billiards and Snooker Association in 1983, he finished his first season ranked 54, and fell to 70th after a further year.

In the 1985 Matchroom Trophy, Duggan defeated veteran Fred Davis, Ray Reardon, Ian Black  and Willie Thorne 5–4 before losing in the quarter-finals, 2–5 to Cliff Thorburn. This marked the best run of Duggan's career up to, and after, that point, and helped improve his world ranking for the 1986–87 season to 35th.

Further success followed; Duggan played Rex Williams in the last 32 of the 1986 International Open, losing 4–5, and Jimmy White in the last 16 at the 1987 Classic, where White defeated him 5–2. At the British Open that year, he lost 2–5 to Thorne in the last 32, but a 3–10 loss to Tony Chappel in qualifying ended his World Championship hopes.

The following year, Duggan progressed further in the World Championship, but was defeated 5–10 by John Virgo in the last 48. In April 1988 Duggan made a 148 in a practice frame against Mark Rowing in Doncaster.

The 1988–89 season saw  Duggan reach the last 32 of the 1988 International Open, Grand Prix, Canadian Masters, UK Championship, and in 1989 he made his first appearance at the Crucible Theatre, in the last 32 of the World Championship. He had defeated Fred Davis, John Spencer and Mark Rowing in the qualifying rounds, but was considered an underdog to his first-round opponent, Cliff Wilson. Duggan led Wilson 5–0 and beat him 10–1, but was eliminated 3–13 by Steve Davis in the last 16; Davis would go on to win that year's championship.

Finishing the 1995–96 season 228th, Duggan lost his professional status.

References

External links 
Steve Duggan at snookerdatabase.co.uk

English snooker players
1958 births
Living people